Bílovice nad Svitavou is a municipality and village in Brno-Country District in the South Moravian Region of the Czech Republic. It has about 3,700 inhabitants.

Geography
It lies in the Drahany Highlands. The Svitava River flows through the municipality.

History
The first written mention of Bílovice nad Svitavou is from 1419.

References

Villages in Brno-Country District